Flat Rock may refer to:

Australia 
Flat Rock or Collins Rock, a low point in Woonona, New South Wales

United States 
 Flat Rock, Alabama
 Flat Rock, Georgia
 Flat Rock (Columbus, Georgia), a residential neighborhood in Columbus, Georgia
 Flat Rock, Illinois
 Flat Rock, Indiana, in Shelby County
 Flat Rock Township, Bartholomew County, Indiana
 Flat Rock, Kentucky
 Flat Rock, Michigan
 Flat Rock, Surry County, North Carolina
 Flat Rock, Henderson County, North Carolina
 Flat Rock, Stokes County, North Carolina
 Flat Rock, Ohio
 Flat Rock, Virginia
 Flat Rock (Kenbridge, Virginia), a historic plantation house in Lunenburg County, Virginia

See also

 Flat Rock Brook Nature Center, New Jersey
 Flatrock (disambiguation)